Erling Knudtzon (born 15 December 1988) is a Norwegian professional footballer who plays as a midfielder for Eliteserien club Molde.

Club career

Early career
Knudtzon began his career with Ullern, joining FC Lyn Oslo in 2007. He made his first team debut on 14 April 2007 against Fredrikstad, and played twenty Norwegian top flight games in his first season, most of them as a starter.

Lillestrøm SK
On 1 February 2010 Knudtzon signed a three-year contract with Lillestrøm, and reunited with his former coach Henning Berg.  Knudtzon played 231 league games for the club.

Molde FK
On 17 July 2018, Molde FK announced that they had signed Knudtzon to a three-year contract, beginning 1 January 2019. He made his Molde debut on 31 March 2019 in a 1–1 away draw against Sarpsborg 08. On 22 April 2019, Knudtzon scored his first goal for Molde in the club's 2–0 away win against his former team Lillestrøm. The game also marked his 300th appearance in the top division of Norwegian football.

International career
Knudtzon played a total of 17 games and scored two goals for Norway at international youth and under-23 level.

Career statistics

Club

Honours

Club
Lillestrøm SK
Norwegian Cup: 2017

Molde
Eliteserien: 2019, 2022
 Norwegian Cup: 2021–22

References

Norwegian footballers
Norway under-21 international footballers
Norway youth international footballers
Ullern IF players
Lyn Fotball players
Lillestrøm SK players
Molde FK players
Eliteserien players
Footballers from Oslo
1988 births
Living people
Association football midfielders